The 1970 Asian Rugby Championship was the second edition of the tournament played in Bangkok, Thailand. Seven countries played round-robin matches in two pools and the first, second, and third place of each pool played placement matches. Japan won the tournament.

Tournament

Pool A 

 Results
 Jan 10
 Jan 12

Pool B 

 Results
 Jan 11
 Jan 13
 Jan 15

Placement matches

5rd place match

3rd place match

Final 

 Thailand: Somsak; Suradet; Ban, Davidson, Blackburn; Jettanakorn; Amnu; Horn, Vikron, Niroj; Apichat, P. Walter; N. Walter, Piyachan, Abhirak. Coach: ???. Japan:Morio Kawasaki; Mitsuo Atokawa, Masaaki Shimozono, Hiroshi Ogasawara, Toshio Terai; Katsumi Kamata; Yoshiaki Izawa, Yoshiharu Yamaguchi; Satoru Matsuoka, Ryozo Imazato, Chikara Katsuraguchi; Yoshihiro Sakata, Makoto Mizutani; Masayoshi Ozaki, Bunji Shimazaki; Tadayuki Ito (capt.), Masaharu Mantani. Coach: Tetsunosuke Onishi

Final standings

Notes 
As of 16 June 2022, the results in Asia Rugby website are incorrect.

References

External links 
 Rugby Football 19巻 (in Japanese)
The above link contains detailed game results. 
T is for try worth 3 points, G is for goal worth 5 points (including try), PG is for penalty goal worth 3 points, and DG is for dropped goal worth 3 points.
 For the scoring detail, refer to History of rugby union
 Results (ESPN.com)
 Results (RugbyArchive)

January 1970 events
Sports competitions in Bangkok
1970 in Thailand
International sports competitions hosted by Thailand
Asia Rugby Championship
1970 in rugby union